Markberg is a hill of Hesse, Germany.

Hills of Hesse
Hills of the Spessart